Kahin Diyaa Jale Kahin Jiyaa is  an Indian soap opera which aired on Sony TV

Plot 
The show was the story of a wealthy Rajvansh family whose scion, Rohit (Mukul Dev), gets engaged to Payal (Prachi Shah), a girl of another prominent family.

The entire Rajput community thinks this is a match made in heaven, but Rohit doesn't. That's because he was madly in love with Suhasini (Reena Wadhwa), who suddenly broke the relationship because she found out she couldn't conceive.

Unaware of all this, Payal marries Rohit, looking forward to a life of bliss. But her dreams are shattered. She soon discovers her mother-in-law wanted Suhasini for a bahu, but the yearning for a grandson was so strong that she had to accept Payal.

Even as Payal is struggling to try to win Rohit over, the Rajvansh family is shocked by a shattering discovery about her past. What will she do? What can she do, trapped as she is in a loveless marriage and scorned by her mother-in-law? Will Suhasini's shadow keep falling on her life? Faced with so many dilemmas, Payal loses hope, but all may not be lost.

Cast
Mukul Dev ... Rohit Rajvansh
Reena Wadhwa ... Suhasini
Rajeeta Kochhar ... Rohit's mother
Prachi Shah ... Payal
Aruna Sangal
Usha Bachani
Adi Irani
Sajni Hanspal ... Gehna, elder sister of Payal
Sanjay Swaraj
Sujata Thakkar ... Rohit's elder sister

References

External links
Official Site on SET Syndication
Kahin Diyaa Jale Kahin Jiyaa Jale Producer's News Article
Kahin Diyaa Jale's Airdate

Indian television soap operas
Sony Entertainment Television original programming
2002 Indian television series debuts